Wada or WADA may refer to:

People
 Wada (Japanese surname), a list of people of Japanese ancestry
 Inuwa Wada (1917-2015), Nigerian politician
 Mian Wada (died 1085), Islamic scholar born in what is now Pakistan
 Tawar Umbi Wada (1957–2010), Nigerian politician

Places
 Wada, Chiba, Japan
 Wada, Nagano, Japan
 Vada, Palghar or Wada, Maharashtra, India

Japanese railway stations
 Nishi-Wada Station, a railway station in Hokkaido, Japan
 Wada-shuku, a railway station in Nagawa, Japan
 Wada Station, a railway station in Akita, Japan
 Wakasa-Wada Station, a railway station in Fukui Prefecture, Japan

Other uses
 Wade (folklore)
 Wada (house), a type of mansion in Western India
 Wada language, a Banda language of Central Africa
 WADA-LD, a former television station licensed to Wilmington, North Carolina, United States
 WOHS, formerly WADA, a radio station in North Carolina, United States
 E. Y. Wada, a New York-based fashion label co-founded by Shuji Wada
 World Anti-Doping Agency
 A name for the Suaeda plant
 A name for the Indian fried snack Vada
 In mathematics, the lakes of Wada

See also